The Bolingbrook Golf Club, a municipal facility located in Bolingbrook, Illinois, United States, features an 18-hole course designed by golf course architect Arthur Hills.

The onsite clubhouse includes a casual restaurant "The Nest Bar and Grill," a restaurant "The East Room," a pro shop, and banquet and meeting facilities. The property also includes the "Golf Academy" featuring a driving range, putting green, and chipping area. The area is open to the public and is accessible by Kings Road.

The facility is managed by KemperSports Management and the web site and digital media was developed by the Ateki Corporation, which is also located in Bolingbrook, IL.

References

External links
Bolingbrook Golf Club website

Golf clubs and courses in Illinois
Bolingbrook, Illinois